NCCP is an abbreviation, and can refer to the following:
National Center for Children in Poverty
National Council of Churches in the Philippines
The National Consumer Credit Protection Act (Australian legislation)
North Coast Computer Project
Nantou County Culture Park, a building in Nantou County, Taiwan
Nuova Compagnia di Canto Popolare
North Carolina Certified Paralegal  
National Council of Churches in Pakistan
 NCCP Structural formula for cyanophosphaethyne